In the Spirit of Things is the eleventh studio album by American rock band Kansas, released in 1988 (see 1988 in music). It is a very loosely organized concept album, telling the story of a flood hitting the real Kansas city of Neosho Falls in 1951. It is the first Kansas album since 1975's Masque to lack a hit single.

History
According to the author Dan Fitzgerald, Rich Williams was inspired to create this album after having read the book Ghost Towns of Kansas, Volume II (1979), specifically the chapter on Neosho Falls.

The album is Kansas's last studio effort for a major label. It didn't receive much promotion, as MCA Records  dropped a slew of "older" artists shortly after its release and famously switched its attention to current younger acts such as Tiffany. Kansas got caught in that decision and the album was a commercial failure. The label did produce several promotional materials for the record, including a glossy video for "Stand Beside Me". The song was played regularly on MTV and allowed the single to hit the album rock charts, the last Kansas single to chart in any format. Other songs were released in odd formats, such as a 12" promotional single of "I Counted on Love", an import edited CD single of "House on Fire", and a small-sized CD single of "Stand Beside Me". The album would also be the last Kansas release to appear in vinyl format until the release of The Prelude Implicit in 2016.

A tour in support of this album included a broadcast by the King Biscuit Flower Hour, which many years later released the show as a CD.

Reception

In its retrospective review, AllMusic deemed the album "one of the group's more consistent albums and easily a latter-day highlight." They criticized the album's dated production and the lack of a single to compare to their 1970s hits, but argued it to be one of Kansas's most focused efforts.

Track listing

Credits
Kansas
Steve Walsh - keyboards, lead vocals
Steve Morse - guitars, vocals
Rich Williams - guitars
Billy Greer - bass, vocals
Phil Ehart - drums, co-producer on tracks 4, 6 and 7

Additional personnel
Greg Robert - keyboard programming, background vocals
Christopher Yavelow - Kurzweil synthesizer sound design
Ricky Keller - percussion programming on track 2, keyboards programming on track 4
Steve Croes - Synclavier
Terry Brock - background vocals on track 4
John Pierce - fretless bass on track 7
Bob Ezrin - percussion, vocals, background vocals
Rev. James Cleveland and the Southern California Community Choir - background vocals on tracks 2, 9 and 10

Production
Bob Ezrin - producer, engineer, mixing, arrangements with Kansas
Greg Ladanyi - co-producer on tracks 4, 6 and 7, engineer, mixing
Garth Richardson - engineer, mixing
Stan Katayama, Bob Loftus, Brendan O'Brien - engineers
Lawrence Fried, Edd Miller - assistant engineers
Stephen Marcussen, Doug Sax, Mike Reese - mastering
Robert Hrycyna - production and technical supervisor
Jack Adams - equipment assistant
Storm Thorgerson - art direction
Paul Maxon - photography, photography production
Tony May, Glenn Wexler, Derek Burnett - photography
Jon Crossland - stylist

Charts
Album 

Singles

References

Kansas (band) albums
1988 albums
Albums produced by Bob Ezrin
Albums produced by Greg Ladanyi
Albums with cover art by Storm Thorgerson
Concept albums
MCA Records albums